The Logic of Collective Action: Public Goods and the Theory of Groups is a book by Mancur Olson Jr. published in 1965. It develops a theory of political science and economics of concentrated benefits versus diffuse costs. Its central argument is that concentrated minor interests will be overrepresented and diffuse majority interests trumped, due to a free-rider problem that is stronger when a group becomes larger.

Overview
The book challenged accepted wisdom in Olson's day that: 
 if everyone in a group (of any size) has interests in common, then they will act collectively to achieve them; and
 in a democracy, the greatest concern is that the majority will tyrannize and exploit the minority.

The book argues instead that individuals in any group attempting collective action will have incentives to "free ride" on the efforts of others if the group is working to provide public goods. Individuals will not "free ride" in groups that provide benefits only to active participants.

Pure public goods are goods that are non-excludable (i.e. one person cannot reasonably prevent another from consuming the good) and non-rivalrous (one person's consumption of the good does not affect another's, nor vice versa). Hence, without selective incentives to motivate participation, collective action is unlikely to occur even when large groups of people with common interests exist.

The book noted that large groups will face relatively high costs when attempting to organize for collective action while small groups will face relatively low costs, and individuals in large groups will gain less per capita of successful collective action. Hence, in the absence of selective incentives, the incentive for group action diminishes as group size increases, so that large groups are less able to act in their common interest than small ones.

The book concludes that, not only is collective action by large groups difficult to achieve even when they have interests in common, but situations could occur where the minority (bound together by concentrated selective incentives) can dominate the majority.

Critique
Olson's original logic of collective action has received several critiques, based either on a different interpretation of the observations on minority interest representation, or on a disagreement on the degree of concentrated interest representation.

Information asymmetry

Lohmann agrees with puzzling observations made by Olson, which she classifies as economic and political puzzles. Economic puzzles are cases of general welfare loss in favour of a minority benefit which is smaller in sum. An example she gives is a quota on sugar imports in the United States, which generates 2261 jobs at the expense of a general welfare reduction of $1,162 million (Hufbauer and Elliott, 1994). Then the implicit price for a job in the sugar industry is above $500,000, allowing for significant room for Pareto improvement. Political puzzles are cases where minority trumps majority. An example she gives is the rural bias in urbanized countries, such as the Common Agricultural Policy in the European Union.

Lohmann claims that Olson's free-rider problem is insufficient to explain these puzzles. Instead, she argues they are due to uncertainty (information asymmetry among actors) when special interest groups evaluate how political actors promote their interests. She states that everyone can be considered a special interest. Because everyone is (relatively) sure how well their interests are represented, they give more weight to their interest representation when evaluating political actors than to the general benefit. Lohmann argues that it could be politically viable to focus on separate narrow interests at the expense of general benefits.

Legitimacy
Trumbull rejects the observation by Olson and Lohmann that concentrated interests dominate public policy. He points out that historically, diffuse interests nearly always found ways to be represented in public policy, such as the interests of retirees, patients or consumers. Trumbull explains this with the role of legitimacy of interest groups that promote policies. He argues that diffuse interests have a legitimacy premium when they manage to mobilize, while concentrated interests are viewed with suspicion. He describes the concept of legitimacy coalitions, which are coalitions between state policymakers, social activists or industry to promote certain policy. By having to form a coalition, the interests are more broadly represented. An example of such a coalition is the post-war neo-corporatist system.

Critical mass 

Marwell and Oliver use mathematical and computational models to show that a number of the assumptions made by Olson are unrealistic, and if they are relaxed, the behavior of a system of rational agents changes dramatically. One assumption is that the "production function" of goods is linear. If this function instead accelerates, then a critical mass of early contributors can encourage a large number of others to contribute. Another assumption is that the cost of the good is a function of the size of the group that would benefit from it. For many public goods, this is not true, and Marwell and Oliver show that when the interest group is larger, there is a larger chance that it will include someone for whom it is rational to provide the good, either in part or in full.

Cost-Benefit distribution 
James Q. Wilson argues that Olson's idea does not include all political constellations and thus cannot be a holistic solution in explaining collective actions. For this argument Wilson explains that costs and benefits are subcategorized in diffuse and concentrated costs and benefits. Olson's constellation in his point of view is merely such that deals with diffuse costs and concentrated benefits.

See also
Bystander effect
Constitutional economics
Deindividuation
Diffusion of responsibility
Groupshift
Tragedy of the commons

References

  Description, Table of Contents, and preview.

Logic of Collective Action
Logic of Collective Action
Logic of Collective Action
Rational choice theory
1965 non-fiction books